Catherine Abercrombie (born April 28, 1961) is an American politician who has served in the Connecticut House of Representatives from the 83rd district since 2005.

References

1961 births
Living people
Politicians from Meriden, Connecticut
Women state legislators in Connecticut
Democratic Party members of the Connecticut House of Representatives
21st-century American politicians
21st-century American women politicians